Jules Dang-Akodo (born 2 May 1996) is a Cameroonian-born British basketball player for Plymouth City Patriots and the Great Britain national team.

He participated at the EuroBasket 2017.

On 18 October 2019 Dang-Akodo signed with the London Lions in England for the 2019–20 BBL season. He averaged 7 points and 3 rebounds per game.

On 5 August 2020, he re-signed with the team for the 2020–21 BBL season.

On 3 June 2021, Dang-Akodo signed with Cheshire Phoenix for the 2021–22 BBL season. On 19 November 2021, Dang-Akodo signed with Surrey Scorchers for the remainder of the BBL Championship.

References

1996 births
Living people
British expatriate basketball people in Slovenia
British expatriate basketball people in Germany
British expatriate basketball people in Spain
Cameroonian emigrants to England
Cameroonian expatriate basketball people in Germany
Cameroonian expatriate basketball people in Spain
Cameroonian men's basketball players
English men's basketball players
London City Royals players
Plymouth City Patriots players
Point guards
Skyliners Frankfurt players
Basketball players from Yaoundé
Cameroonian expatriate basketball people in Slovenia